DXWM (91.9 FM) Radyo Rapido is a radio station owned and operated by Kalayaan Broadcasting System, Inc. The studio is located in Capitol Hills, Mati, Davao Oriental.

It was formerly known as Sunrise FM from 2008 to 2015, when it transferred to 102.3 to give way for the launching of Radyo Rapido.

References

Radio stations in Davao Oriental
Radio stations established in 2008